St. Lunatics was an American hip hop group formed in St. Louis, Missouri, in 1993. The group consisted of childhood friends Nelly, Ali, Murphy Lee, Kyjuan, City Spud, and Slo Down.

Career
After graduating from high school, the band members were working day jobs in the service industry or attending college. St. Lunatics' first local independent hit was "Gimme What U Got", released in 1996. In 1997, DJ Kut on The Beat FM started playing the single locally, generating interest in the group. In 2000, Nelly was signed to Universal Records, followed by the rest of the group. While Nelly was working on his solo album Country Grammar, City Spud was arrested and sentenced to ten years in prison for robbery. After Nelly's breakthrough success in 2000, St. Lunatics released their debut album, Free City. In 2001, the singles "Summer in the City" and "Midwest Swing" were released. Free City was certified Platinum in the United States and Gold in Canada.

In 2002, Ali issued his solo album Heavy Starch while Murphy Lee published Murphy's Law in 2003. Murphy later launched his own label, UC ME Entertainment. Nelly went on to have a successful solo career and in 2011, he partnered with St. Louis-based Vatterott College to open a music production school in downtown St. Louis, called Ex'treme Institute (E.I.).

In 2009, St. Lunatics were reportedly working on a new album, City Free, to be released that summer. The album was postponed until 2011. A song titled "St. Lunatics" was leaked in early March 2009, along with "Get Low 2 Da Flo", which was produced by Play-N-Skillz. The first official single released from the album was "Money Talks", featuring rapper Birdman. The second official single released from the album was "Polo".

Discography

Studio albums

Compilations

Singles

References

Musical groups established in 1993
Musical groups from St. Louis
Midwest hip hop groups
American hip hop groups